WASD may refer to:

 Wallenpaupack Area School District
 WASD keys, the default mapping in most video games for the movement of the player using a keyboard.
 Wide Area Surveillance Division, a VMS web server